Kosmos 458 ( meaning Cosmos 458), known before launch as DS-P1-Yu No.53, was a Soviet satellite which was launched in 1971 as part of the Dnepropetrovsk Sputnik programme. It was a  spacecraft, which was built by the Yuzhnoye Design Bureau, and was used as a radar calibration target for anti-ballistic missile tests.

Launch 
Kosmos 458 was successfully launched into low Earth orbit on 29 November 1971, with the rocket lifting off at 10:09:56 UTC. The launch took place from Site 133/1 at the Plesetsk Cosmodrome, and used a Kosmos-2I 63SM carrier rocket.

Orbit 
Upon reaching orbit, it was assigned its Kosmos designation, and received the International Designator 1971-101A. The North American Aerospace Defense Command assigned it the catalogue number 05623.

Kosmos 458 was the forty-eighth of seventy nine DS-P1-Yu satellites to be launched, and the forty-third of seventy two to successfully reach orbit. It remained in orbit until it decayed and reentered the atmosphere on 20 April 1972.

See also

 1971 in spaceflight

References

1971 in spaceflight
Kosmos satellites
Spacecraft launched in 1971
Dnepropetrovsk Sputnik program